The European pilchard (Sardina pilchardus) is a species of ray-finned fish in the monotypic genus Sardina. The young of the species are among the many fish that are sometimes called sardines. This schooling species is a batch spawner where each female lays 50,000–60,000 eggs.

Description

The European pilchard is a small to medium-sized, somewhat elongated, herring-like fish. The origin of the pelvic fins is well behind that of the dorsal fin, and the last two soft rays on the anal fin are larger than the remainder. The upper parts are green or olive, the flanks are golden and the belly is silvery.

Distribution and habitat
The European pilchard occurs in the northeastern Atlantic Ocean, the Mediterranean Sea and the Black Sea. Its range extends from Iceland and the southern part of Norway and Sweden southwards to Senegal in West Africa. In the Mediterranean Sea it is common in the western half and the Adriatic Sea, but uncommon in the eastern half and the Black Sea. It is a migratory, schooling, largely coastal species but sometimes travels as far as  out to sea. At night it is generally from  beneath the surface.

Ecology

In the Mediterranean, the European pilchard moves offshore in the autumn, preferring the deeper cooler waters and constant salinity out at sea to the variable temperatures and salinities of inshore waters. Spawning starts to take place in winter, and in early spring, juveniles, larvae and some adults move towards the coast, while other adults migrate inshore later in the year. Multiple batches of eggs are produced over a long breeding period, total fecundity being 50,000 to 60,000.

The diet consists of both zooplankton and phytoplankton. The zooplankton is largely copepods and their larvae, which make daily vertical migrations to feed near the surface at night, and this is when the adult pilchards feed on them; juveniles feed during the day as well. Along with the European anchovy (Engraulis encrasicolus), the European pilchard plays an important intermediate role in the Mediterranean ecosystem as a consumer of plankton and as a food for larger demersal predators such as the European hake (Merluccius merluccius) and the European conger eel (Conger conger). This role is particularly noticeable in the Adriatic Sea where the water is shallow, the food chain is shorter and energy is retained within the basin; overfishing of pilchard and anchovy can thus cause dramatic changes in the ecosystem.

Fisheries and uses

There are important fisheries for this species in most of its range. It is mainly caught with purse seines and lampara nets, but other methods are also used including bottom trawling with high opening nets. In total, around a million tonnes are taken annually, with Morocco, Portugal and Spain having the largest catches. The Food and Agriculture Organization (FAO) considers the Moroccan fishery overfished. 

The adults may be sold as pilchards; the juveniles, as sardines. The terms "sardine" and "pilchard” are not precise, and what is meant depends on the region. The United Kingdom's Sea Fish Industry Authority, for example, classifies sardines as young pilchards. The FAO/WHO Codex standard for canned sardines cites 21 species that may be classed as sardines.

The fish is sold fresh, frozen or canned, or is salted and smoked or dried; as the flesh is of low value, some of the catch is used for fishing bait, fertilizer and some is manufactured into fish meal.

See also

 History of the pilchard fishery
 Sardines as food

References

European pilchard
Fish of Europe
Fish of the Mediterranean Sea
Marine fauna of North Africa
European pilchard
Taxa named by Johann Julius Walbaum